Two Mules for Sister Sara is a 1970 American-Mexican Western film in Panavision directed by Don Siegel and starring Shirley MacLaine (billed above Clint Eastwood in the film's credits, but not on the poster) set during the French intervention in Mexico (1861–1867). The film was to have been the first in a five-year exclusive association between Universal Pictures and Sanen Productions of Mexico. It was the second of five collaborations between Siegel and Eastwood, following Coogan's Bluff (1968). The collaboration continued with The Beguiled and Dirty Harry (both 1971) and finally Escape from Alcatraz (1979).

The plot follows an American mercenary who gets mixed up with a nun and aids a group of Juarista rebels during the puppet reign of Emperor Maximilian in Mexico. The film featured both American and Mexican actors and actresses, including being filmed in the picturesque countryside near Tlayacapan, Morelos. Ennio Morricone composed the film's music.

Plot
Just after the American Civil War, a former soldier named Hogan (Clint Eastwood) rides up on a naked woman about to be raped by bandits. He kills the bandits and discovers the woman is a nun, Sister Sara (Shirley MacLaine), who is raising money to assist Mexican revolutionaries fighting French occupying forces. When Sara requests that Hogan take her to the Mexican camp he agrees, as he had previously arranged to help the revolutionaries attack the French garrison, in exchange for half the garrison's treasury.

As the duo heads towards the camp, evading French troops all the while, Hogan is surprised that the nun swears and drinks whiskey. While on their way to destroy a French ammunition train, Hogan is shot at by Indians and seriously wounded with an arrow. Sara is able to tend to his wounds, and she is able to set the charges that Hogan detonates to destroy the train. Eventually the two reach Juarista commander Col. Beltran's camp. Sara begs the local villagers for money needed to purchase dynamite for the assault on the garrison. In the lead up to the attack Sara reveals to Hogan that she is not a nun, but a prostitute posing as a nun because she is wanted by the French for her support of the revolutionaries. Although Hogan is shocked, the two team up to infiltrate the fort and let a squad of revolutionaries in through a trapdoor, while two other squads attack the gates and a fourth act as sharpshooters.

They expected the French army to be drunk for Bastille day but the destruction of the train has put the garrison on high alert. Hogan and Sara infiltrate the fortress by Hogan posing as a bounty hunter who has captured Sara and is turning her in for the reward. The ruse works, Hogan and Sara engage the French commanding officers while the garrison's gates are breached for the Mexican revolutionary forces to swarm through. A battle ensues; the French are defeated, and the Mexicans capture the fort. As promised, Hogan receives half the riches. Now wealthy and with his job completed, Hogan sets off with Sara, with whom he has fallen in love, to open a gambling house in San Francisco.

Cast
 Clint Eastwood as Hogan
 Shirley MacLaine as Sara
 Manolo Fábregas as Col. Beltrán
 Alberto Morin as Gen. LeClaire
 Armando Silvestre as 1st American
 John Kelly as 2nd American
 Enrique Lucero as 3rd American
 David Estuardo as Juan
 Ada Carrasco as Juan's mother
 Pancho Córdova as Juan's father
 José Chávez as Horacio
 José Ángel Espinosa as French Officer
 Rosa Furman as Sara's friend

Production

Development
Budd Boetticher, a long term-resident of Mexico renowned for his series of Randolph Scott westerns, wrote the original 1967 screenplay that was bought with the provision that he would direct. Boetticher had planned the film for Robert Mitchum and Deborah Kerr, who had played a man of action and a nun in Heaven Knows, Mr. Allison. Kerr's character was a member of the Mexican aristocracy escaping the vengeance of the Mexican Revolution, with Mitchum's cowboy protecting her as he led her to safety to the United States.

Carrol Case sold the screenplay to Martin Rackin, who had Albert Maltz, also living in Mexico, rewrite the story. Maltz's version had Clint Eastwood playing a soldier of fortune for the Juaristas and Shirley MacLaine playing a revolutionary prostitute now set during the French intervention in Mexico. The film saw Eastwood embody the tall mysterious stranger once more, unshaven, wearing a serape-like vest and smoking a cigar and the film score was composed by Ennio Morricone. Although the film had Leonesque dirty Hispanic villains, the film was considerably less crude and more sardonic than those of Leone.

Boetticher expressed disgust that MacLaine's bawdy character obviously did not resemble a nun, as opposed to his idea of a genteel lady whose final revelation would have been more of a surprise to the audience. Though Boetticher was friends with both Eastwood and director Don Siegel, Siegel understood Boetticher's dislike of the final film. Boetticher asked Siegel how he could make an awful film like that; Siegel replied that it was a great feeling to wake up in the morning and know there was a check in the mail, and Boetticher riposted that it was a better feeling to wake up in the morning and be able to look at yourself in the mirror.

Casting
Eastwood had been shown the script by Elizabeth Taylor (at the time, the wife of Richard Burton) during the filming of Where Eagles Dare; she hoped to play the role of Sister Sara. It was initially offered to her, but she had to turn down the role because she wanted to shoot in Spain where Burton was making his latest film. Sister Sara was supposed to be Mexican, but Shirley MacLaine was cast instead. Although they were initially unconvinced with her pale complexion, Eastwood believed that the studio was keen on MacLaine as they had high hopes for her film Sweet Charity, in which she played a taxi dancer. Both Siegel and Eastwood felt she was unfriendly on set, and Siegel described MacLaine thus: "It's hard to feel any great warmth to her. She's too unfeminine and has too much balls. She's very, very hard." Two Mules for Sister Sara marked the last time that Eastwood would receive second billing for a film.

Filming
The film was shot over 65 days in Mexico and cost around $4 million. Many of the cast and crew, including MacLaine, were stricken by illness while filming, due to having to adjust to the food and water in Mexico.

Bruce Surtees was a camera operator on the film, and acted as a go-between for Siegel and cinematographer Gabriel Figueroa; this led to his working on Siegel's next film The Beguiled. Figueroa used many photographic filters for effects in the film.

Eastwood revealed that he actually killed a rattlesnake for a scene in the film, as Mexican authorities did not want it released in the area after filming was over. Eastwood noted that he did not want to kill it, as he is opposed to killing animals.

Release
The film opened May 28, 1970 in Dallas, Texas. It also opened in Denver the same week.

Reception

Critical response
Two Mules for Sister Sara received moderately favorable reviews, and Roger Greenspun of the New York Times reported, "I'm not sure it is a great movie, but it is very good and it stays and grows on the mind the way only movies of exceptional narrative intelligence do". Stanley Kauffmann of The New Republic described the film as "an attempt to keep old Hollywood alive—a place where nuns can turn out to be disguised whores, where heroes can always have a stick of dynamite under their vests, where every story has not one but two cute finishes. Its kind of The African Queen gone west". In a review by the Los Angeles Herald-Examiner, Two Mules for Sister Sara was called "a solidly entertaining film that provides Clint Eastwood with his best, most substantial role to date; in it he is far better than he has ever been. In director Don Siegel, Eastwood has found what John Wayne found in John Ford and what Gary Cooper found in Frank Capra."

The New York Times included Two Mules for Sister Sara in its book, The New York Times Guide to the Best 1,000 Movies Ever Made. Author Howard Hughes joked that critics "couldn't argue that Eastwood's acting was second to nun."

Box office
In its opening week in Denver, it grossed $35,000 from 2 theaters. The film returned $4.7 million in theatrical rentals in the United States and Canada, rendering it a solid, modestly profitable hit (a movie's gross is often close to twice the domestic rentals figure).

Accolades

See also
 List of American films of 1970

References

Bibliography

External links
 
 
 
 
 Two Mules for Sister Sara at Rotten Tomatoes

1970 films
1970 Western (genre) films
American Western (genre) films
Mexican Western (genre) films
Films directed by Don Siegel
Second French intervention in Mexico films
Films shot in Mexico
Films set in Mexico
Films scored by Ennio Morricone
Malpaso Productions films
1970s English-language films
1970s American films
1970s Mexican films